Joseph Herbert Lowell Green (September 7, 1860 – ?) was a member of the Wisconsin State Senate.

Biography
Green was born on September 7, 1860 in Fond du Lac, Wisconsin, the son of Joseph Anson Green and Catherine Lowell Green. He was educated in the public schools of Oshkosh, Wisconsin.

Career
He worked as a salesman for a dry goods business in Chicago from 1880 to 1888. He later opened his own retail dry goods business in Milwaukee, which he operated from 1888 to 1897.

Green was a member of the Senate from 1897 to 1903. Additionally, he was a member of the Milwaukee County, Wisconsin Republican Committee.

References

External links
The Political Graveyard

Politicians from Fond du Lac, Wisconsin
Businesspeople from Wisconsin
Republican Party Wisconsin state senators
1860 births
Year of death missing